Kim Se-yong (born November 20, 1991) is a South Korean singer, rapper, and actor. Signed to H2 Media, he made his debut with idol quintet Myname in 2011. Kim began his acting career two years prior, appearing on the television series Green Coach. He released his first mini-album Connection independent from Myname in Japan in May 2019.

Life and career

1991–2008: Early life
Kim Se-yong was born on November 20, 1991, in Busan. In his youth, he aspired to become a soccer player. A friend uploaded Kim's photos onto an ulzzang website, which resulted in him being offered to become a trainee under JYP Entertainment. A representative of the agency traveled from Seoul to convince his parents to allow him to join, which they encouraged. Kim accepted the proposal and, attributing to other circumstances at the time, stopped playing the sport. While under the company, Kim wanted to become an actor and he enrolled at Seoul Institute of the Arts with a major in theater and film. He spent three years training under the entertainment label before deciding to leave and pursue acting. After seeing 2PM perform in concert, he was motivated to become a singer again.

2009–present: Career

Prior to his debut as a recording artist, Kim appeared on Seoul Broadcasting System's (SBS) 2009 television series Green Coach. He was also cast in KBS2's drama Believe in Love as Lee Seong-min, a member of a fictional idol group. Kim served as a backup dancer for Hwanhee during performances of the single "Love Pain" and was featured on the album track "I Love You I Love You". He debuted as a rapper in the idol group Myname in 2011. He was a trainee for an accumulated five years and nine months, the longest period among his bandmates. The group released its debut single "Message" on October 28. A Japanese-language version of the song was released the following July, which served as its introductory single in the country. The group was simultaneously active in the music industry of both countries. Beginning in 2015, Myname's promotional activities in South Korea waned.

Kim participated in the 2016 dance competition television series Hit the Stage. He was cast in Power Rangers Dino Force Brave, where he played Kwon Ju-yong, the Brave Red Dino. He went on to compete on the survival competition program The Unit: Idol Rebooting Project along with bandmates JunQ, Chaejin, and Gunwoo. It was their first domestic promotional activities in two years. The participants competed to become a member of the all-male unit UNB. Kim advanced into the final round, but did not rank in the upper tier. He released his first solo mini-album Connection in Japan on May 10, 2019. It peaked at number 41 on the country's national Oricon Albums Chart. He was cast in the musical Oh, Mr. Park! (2019) as Hwang Tae-kyeong.

Discography

Albums

Mini-albums

Singles

Guest appearances

Soundtrack appearances

Filmography

Television series

Theater

References

1991 births
21st-century South Korean male actors
21st-century South Korean  male singers
Japanese-language singers of South Korea
K-pop singers
Living people
Musicians from Busan
Myname members
Seoul Institute of the Arts alumni
South Korean contemporary R&B singers
South Korean dance musicians
South Korean J-pop singers
South Korean male film actors
South Korean male idols
South Korean male stage actors
South Korean male television actors